Essayons is a French word meaning "let us try". It can refer to the following ships:
 
 
 
 

Ship names